David Livingston Crawford (March 7, 1889 – January 18, 1974) was an American entomologist, coach of football and basketball, and college professor and administrator. He served as the head football coach at the University of Hawaii from 1917 to 1919. He also coached the Hawaii basketball team during the 1918–19 season.  Crawford attended Pomona College and Cornell University. He taught at Pomona before coming to Hawaii, where he was head of the entomology department. Crawford served as president of the University of Hawaii from 1927 to 1941. He was the president of Doane College—now known as Doane University—in Crete, Nebraska from 1948 to 1954. Crawford died on January 18, 1974, of Parkinson's disease, at a nursing home in Moorestown Township, New Jersey.

Head coaching record

Football

References

1889 births
1974 deaths
20th-century American zoologists
American entomologists
Cornell University alumni
Hawaii Rainbow Warriors basketball coaches
Hawaii Rainbow Warriors football coaches
Leaders of the University of Hawaiʻi at Mānoa
Pomona College alumni
Pomona College faculty
University of Hawaiʻi faculty
People from Hermosillo
Neurological disease deaths in New Jersey
Deaths from Parkinson's disease
20th-century American academics